The Ben NanoNote (officially the 本 NanoNote) is a pocket computer using the Linux-based OpenWrt operating system. An open-source hardware device developed by Qi Hardware, it has been called possibly "the world's smallest Linux laptop for the traditional definition of the word.". In addition, the Ben NanoNote is noteworthy for being one of the few devices on the market running entirely on copyleft hardware.

The computer takes its name from the Chinese character běn (本), translated as "an origin or the beginning place."

History 

Originally the hardware was developed by a third party as a digital dictionary. After the effort of several Qi Hardware developers, the design was freed as open source hardware while using free and open source software.

The product used to be manufactured by Qi hardware and Sharism At Work Ltd. As of 2011, more than 1,000 units had been sold.

Software 

The device is shipped with the OpenWrt software stack; the custom compilation includes a graphical menu called gmenu2x, with other graphical and command line applications available from the menu.

OpenEmbedded is also available through the Jlime distribution. The Pyneo software stack, a Debian-like distribution aimed for mobiles has been ported. The MIPS architecture port of Debian Linux can be run on the NanoNote. Additionally there is NanoNixOS, a cross-compiled distribution based on the Nix package manager.

Reception

After the 2010 introduction of the Ben NanoNote, reviewers praised its small size and low cost (US$99), but also criticized the device for its initial lack of any networking capability and for its extremely modest data storage and RAM capabilities in comparison to other contemporary devices.

Product development 

Because the device lacked wireless connectivity, implementing this was one of the first goals for the Qi Hardware movement. This add-on, the Ben WPAN, was developed by Werner Almesberger, and mainly consists of an IEEE 802.15.4 subsystem, made up of two boards: a USB dongle (ATUSB) connected to the computer and another card connected to the SDIO port of the device (ATBEN).

All source code, documentation and test procedures, software and hardware schematics are available under copyleft licenses.

UBB, or Universal Breakout Board, is a PCB shaped like a microSD card, focused on DIY projects and general purpose interfacing using the available MMC/SDIO port.

So far two hacks had been published: one of them, the integration with a 443 MHz RF transceiver for power sockets control purposes and later a mix of bit banging and SDIO/DMA features turning the SD card slot into a VGA port.

As the Ben NanoNote uses an Ingenic JZ4720 processor it supports booting from USB without use of the NAND flash memory.

Derivatives 

The SIE board is an adaptation of the NanoNote. It has twice the memory and features a XC3S Xilinx FPGA on board. It is based on the XBurst JZ4725 SoC, which has more I/O pins available due to not having a keyboard.

Technical specifications 

 XBurst JZ4720 336 MHz MIPS processor from Ingenic Semiconductor
 3.0" 320x240 pixels colour TFT LCD
 32 MB SDRAM
 2 GB NAND flash memory
 1 SDHC slot (SDIO/DMA capable)
 59-key keyboard
 Stereo headphones connector, mono speaker and microphone
 USB Client 2.0 High-Speed Device, Mini B connector
 3.7 V, 850 mAh Li-ion battery
 Overall dimension (lid closed): 99 * 75 * 17.5mm. (display: 7.5mm, keyboard: 10mm)
 Weight:  (including battery)

See also 
 List of open source computing hardware
 List of open source hardware projects
 Milkymist

References

Further reading
 Melanson, Donald ( March 15, 2010). "Qi Hardware's tiny, hackable Ben NanoNote now shipping." AOL Engadget.

External links 

 
 Qi Hardware Launches Open-Source Computer PCMag.com
 Hands-on: Ben NanoNote Micronotebook Linux Magazine Online
 Open-source hardware group puts out vid system-on-a-chip. The Register.
 A Review: Ben NanoNote Gets Small with Embedded Linux Linux.com

Computer-related introductions in 2010
Consumer electronics brands
Open computers
Linux-based devices
Personal digital assistants
Embedded Linux